Man's Fate (French: La Condition humaine, "The Human Condition") is a 1933 novel written by André Malraux about the failed communist insurrection in Shanghai in 1927, and the existential quandaries facing a diverse group of people associated with the revolution. Along with Les Conquérants (1928 – "The Conquerors") and La Voie Royale (1930 – "The Royal Way"), it forms a trilogy on revolution in Asia.

The novel was translated into English twice, both translations appearing in 1934, one by Haakon Chevalier under the title Man's Fate, published by Harrison Smith & Robert Haas in New York and republished by Random House as part of their Modern Library from 1936 on, and the other by Alastair MacDonald under the title Storm in Shanghai, published by Methuen in London and republished, still by Methuen, in 1948 as Man's Estate, to become a Penguin pocket in 1961. Currently the Chevalier translation is the only one still in regular print.

In 1958 Hannah Arendt published The Human Condition, one of her central theoretical works, whose English name is identical to the French title of Malraux's book; to avoid confusion, Arendt's book was translated in French first as Condition de l’homme moderne (The Condition of the Modern Man), then as L'Humaine Condition.

Plot summary

The novel occurs during a 22-day period mostly in Shanghai, China and concerns mainly the socialist insurrectionists and others involved in the conflict. The four primary protagonists are Chen Ta Erh (whose name is spelled Tchen in the French original of the book), Kyoshi ("Kyo") Gisors, the Soviet emissary Katow, and Baron Clappique. Their individual plights are intertwined throughout the book.

Chen Ta Erh is sent to assassinate an authority, succeeds, and is later killed in a failed suicide bombing attempt on Chiang Kai-shek. After the assassination, he becomes governed by fatality and desires simply to kill, thereby fulfill his duty as a terrorist, a duty which controls his life. This is largely the result of being so close to death since assassinating a man. He is so haunted by death and his powerlessness over inevitability that he wishes to die, just to end his torment.

Kyo Gisors is the commander of the revolt and believes that every person should choose his own meaning, not be governed by any external forces. He spends most of the story trying to keep power in the hands of the workers rather than the Kuomintang army and resolving a conflict between himself and his wife, May. He is eventually captured and, in a final act of self-determination, chooses to take his own life with cyanide.

Katow had faced execution once before, during the Russian Civil War and was saved at the last moment, which gives him a feeling of psychological immunity. After witnessing Kyo's death, he watches with a kind of calm detachment as his fellow revolutionaries are taken out one by one, to be thrown alive into the chamber of a steam locomotive waiting outside, intending, when his turn comes, to use his own cyanide capsule. But hearing two young Chinese activists talk with trembling fear of being burned alive, he gives them the cyanide, as there is only enough for two, so that he himself is left to face the more fearsome death. He thus dies in an act of self-sacrifice and solidarity with weaker comrades.

Baron Clappique is a French merchant, smuggler, and obsessive gambler. He helps Kyo get a shipment of guns through and is later told that Kyo will be killed unless he leaves the city in 48 hours. On the way to warn him, he gets involved with gambling and cannot stop.  He considers gambling "suicide without dying". Clappique is very good-humored and always cheerful all the time but suffers inwardly. He later escapes the city dressed as a sailor.

Characters
Chen Ta Erh – the assassin, protagonist
Kyo Gisors – the leader of the revolt, protagonist
Baron Clappique – a French merchant and smuggler, protagonist
Old Gisors – Kyo's father, one-time professor of Sociology at the University of Peking, and an opium addict, acts as a guide for Kyo and Ch’en
May Gisors – Kyo's wife and a German doctor, born in Shanghai
Katow – a Russian, one of the organizers of the insurrection, he is burned alive for treason.
Hemmelrich – a Belgian phonograph-dealer
Yu Hsuan – his partner
Kama – a Japanese painter, Old Gisors' brother-in-law
Ferral – president of the French chamber of commerce and head of the France-Asiatic Consortium; he struggles with his relationship with Valerie because he only wishes to possess her as an object
Valerie – Ferral's girlfriend.
Konig – chief of Chiang Kai-shek's police
Suan – young Chinese terrorist who helped Ch’en, later arrested in the same attack in which Ch'en was killed
Pei – also helper of Ch’en

Awards and nominations
This book won the Prix Goncourt French literature award in 1933, and in 1999 was named number five in Le Monde's 100 Books of the Century. Since its publication, the novel has an estimated total sale (in French) of 5 million copies, all editions considered, placing the book as a bestseller in the history of the Prix Goncourt.

Critical reception
The journalist Christopher Hitchens, while noting that Malraux had spent almost no time in China, claimed that the novel "pointed up the increasing weight of Asia in world affairs; it described epic moments of suffering and upheaval, in Shanghai especially (it was nearly filmed by Sergei Eisenstein); and it demonstrated a huge respect for Communism and for Communists while simultaneously evoking the tragedy of a revolution betrayed by Moscow."  His biographer Olivier Todd quotes the novel as saying "It was neither true nor false but what was experienced," and remarks that Malraux's China itself was "neither  true in its detail nor false overall, but it is nonetheless imaginary," and that it "cannot quite break clear of a conventional idea of China with coolies, bamboo shoots, opium smokers, destitutes, and prostitutes."
A 1972 Penguin edition of the MacDonald translation claims on its back cover that Malraux had been "a member of the revolutionary committee" in Shanghai. This claim is false.

Film adaptations
Four attempts have been made to adapt Man's Fate as a motion picture, but none came to fruition.  The first involved Fred Zinnemann, who spent three years preparing his film version of Man's Fate before the producing studio, Metro-Goldwyn-Mayer, cancelled the production one week before filming was to begin in November 1969. Independent producer Sidney Beckerman hired Costa-Gavras to adapt the novel and direct in 1979, but the project was abandoned when the Ministry of Culture of the People's Republic of China denied permission to film in the country. The Italian director Bernardo Bertolucci proposed adapting the novel in the 1980s to the Chinese government; they preferred his alternative proposal, The Last Emperor, a 1987 biopic based on the life of the Chinese Emperor Puyi. In 2001, U.S. filmmaker Michael Cimino announced he would create a film version of Man's Fate but, as of his death, the project remained unrealized.

Selected translations

The WorldCat listing for Man's Fate lists translations into at least seventeen languages.
 (Chinese) 人的命运 Ren De Mingyun. (Chengdu: Sichuan wenyi chu ban she,  1996) 
 (English) Haakon Chevalier. Man's Fate. (New York: Modern Library,  1934)
 (English) Alistair Macdonald, tr. Storm in Shanghai Methuen 1934 reissued as Man's Estate, 1948
 (Finnish) Juha Mannerkorpi, tr. Sielujen kapina [the rebellion of souls] (Helsinki: Tammi, 1947) 
 (Hebrew) Yitzhak Shenhar, tr.  חיי אנוש  Haye-Enosh : Roman. (Tel Aviv: Avraham Yosef Shtibel,  1935
 (Korean) 인간의조건 Ingan Chokon (Seoul: Hongsin Munhwasa,  2012) 
 (Polish) Adam Wazyk, tr.. Dola Czlowiecza. (Wroclaw [u.a]: Zaklad Narodowy Im. Ossolinskich,  2001) 
 (Spanish) César A. Comet and Mario Vargas Llosa, tr. La Condición Humana. (Barcelona: Círculo de Lectores,  2001) 
 (Swedish) Axel Claëson, tr. Människans lott (Stockholm: Tiden, 1934)
 (Turkish) Ali Berktay, tr. Insanlik Durumu (Istanbul: Iletisim Yayinlari,  2003) 
 (Yiddish) Solomon Levadi, tr. דער גורל פון מענטשDer Goyrl Fun Mentsh. (Varshe: Yidishe universal-bibliotek,  2000)

See also

Shanghai massacre of 1927
Chinese Civil War
Le Monde 100 Books of the Century

References

1933 French novels
Works by André Malraux
French historical novels
French philosophical novels
Novels about revolutionaries
Novels set in China
Novels set in the 1920s
Fiction set in 1927
Novels set in Shanghai
Chinese Civil War
History of Shanghai
Prix Goncourt winning works